Guugram may refer to:

Places and divisions 
 Gurugram, Gurgaon city
 Gurugram district, Gurgaon district
 Gurugram Division Gurgaon Division
 Gurugram (Lok Sabha constituency), Gurgaon (Lok Sabha constituency)
 Gurugram, a historical city in Assam

Art and entertainment 
 Gurgaon (film), a 2017 Indian film

See also
 Girgaon
 Goregaon